The following are lists of members of the Senate of Canada:

 List of current senators of Canada
 List of Senate of Canada appointments by prime minister
 Alphabetically: A, B, C, D, E, F, G, H, I, J, K, L, M, N, O, P, Q, R, S, T, U, V, W, X, Y, Z
By province:
 British Columbia
 Alberta
 Saskatchewan
 Manitoba
 Ontario
 Quebec
 New Brunswick
 Prince Edward Island
 Nova Scotia
 Newfoundland and Labrador
 Territories
By Parliament:
 1st Parliament of Canada
 26th Parliament of Canada
 27th Parliament of Canada
 28th Parliament of Canada
 29th Parliament of Canada
 30th Parliament of Canada
 31st Parliament of Canada
 32nd Parliament of Canada
 33rd Parliament of Canada
 34th Parliament of Canada
 35th Parliament of Canada
 36th Parliament of Canada
 37th Parliament of Canada
 38th Parliament of Canada
 39th Parliament of Canada
 40th Parliament of Canada
 41st Parliament of Canada
 42nd Parliament of Canada
Senate-related offices:
 List of speakers of the Senate
 List of leaders of the government in the Senate (Canada)
 List of representatives of the Government in the Senate (Canada)
 List of leaders of the opposition in the Senate of Canada

Notes 

 
 
Senate of Canada